Faduley Rodrigues Sousa Baía (born 10 March 1992), simply known as Faduley, is a
São Toméan footballer who plays as a forward for Portuguese club Castrense and the São Tomé and Príncipe national team. He also holds Portuguese citizenship.

International career
Faduley made his international debut on 4 June 2016, when he entered as a 74th-minute substitute in a loss Africa Cup of Nations qualifier against Cape Verde.

International goals 

|-
| 1. || 4 June 2016 || Estádio Nacional 12 de Julho, São Tomé, São Tomé and Príncipe ||  ||  ||  || 2017 Africa Cup of Nations qualification || 
|}

References

External links 
 
 
 

1992 births
Living people
People from São Tomé
São Tomé and Príncipe footballers
Association football forwards
AC Vila Meã players
União Montemor players
G.D. Vitória de Sernache players
São Tomé and Príncipe international footballers
São Tomé and Príncipe expatriate footballers
São Tomé and Príncipe expatriate sportspeople in Portugal
Expatriate footballers in Portugal